Jef Lambeaux or Josef Lambeaux (14 January 18525 June 1908) was a Belgian sculptor. His best known work is Temple of Human Passions, a colossal marble bas-relief.

Early life and education
Lambeaux was born in Antwerp, Belgium, on 14 January 1852.  He studied at the Antwerp Academy of Fine Arts, and was a pupil of Jean Geefs. He was part of a group of young artists, the "Van Beers clique", led by Jan van Beers. This group included the artists Piet Verhaert (1852–1908) and Alexander Struys (1852–1941). They were well known for their mischievous and eccentric behaviour, including walking around Antwerp dressed in historic costumes.

Career

His first work, War, was exhibited in 1871, and was followed by a long series of humorous groups, including Children Dancing, Say Good Morning, The Lucky Number and; An Accident (1875). He then went to Paris, where he executed The Beggar and The Blini Pauper for the Belgian salons, and produced The Kiss (1881), generally regarded as his masterpiece. Claire J. R. Colinet – who would have great success during her career in the Art Deco era – was one of Lambeaux's students during his time in Paris. After visiting Italy, where he was much impressed by the works of Jean Boulogne, he showed a strong predilection for effects of force and motion.

Other notable works include his Brabo fountain in Antwerp (1886), Robbing the Eagles Eyrie (1890), Drunkenness (1893), The Triumph of Woman, The Bitten Faun (which created a great stir at the Exposition Universelle at Liège in 1905), and The Human Passions, a colossal marble bas-relief, elaborated from a sketch exhibited in 1889. Of his numerous busts may be mentioned those of Hendrik Conscience, and of Charles Buls, the burgomaster of Brussels.

Temple of Human Passions
Lambeaux didn't escape the wrath of art critics when he showed a life-size model of Temple of Human Passions at the Salon Triennial in Ghent in 1889. The sculpture managed to attract such fury and uproar that in 1890 the journal L’Art Moderne described the work as follows:

Death
Lambeaux died on 5 June 1908 in Brussels.

Honours 
 1887: Knight in the Order of Leopold.

Gallery

Jef Lambeaux Museum

In 2006 the association "ASBL Musée Jef Lambeaux" was set up to promote the creation of a museum dedicated to the artist in Saint-Gilles, Belgium. The museum was already promised by the municipality of Saint-Gilles in 1898 but never built.

Notes 

Alain Jacobs, https://collections.heritage.brussels/fr/objects/42758 [archive]https://collections.heritage.brussels/fr/objects/42760 [archive] https://collections.heritage.brussels/fr/objects/4275 [archive]9 [archive]https://collections.heritage.brussels/fr/objects/42761 [archive]

 
Belgian sculptors
1852 births
1908 deaths
Artists from Antwerp
Royal Academy of Fine Arts (Antwerp) alumni